Lesley Kerkhove and Lidziya Marozava were the defending champions, but Marozava chose not to participate. 

Kerkhove partnered alongside Anna Blinkova and successfully defended her title, defeating Nao Hibino and Danka Kovinić in the final, 7–5, 6–4.

Seeds

Draw

Draw

References
Main Draw

Zhuhai Open - Doubles
2018 Women's Doubles